"Some People" is a song by British musician Belouis Some, which was released as the third single from his 1985 eponymous debut album. The song reached the top 40 in the UK, peaking at No. 33 on the UK Singles Chart in April 1986. In the U.S., the song reached No. 67 on the Billboard Hot 100.

Music video
The music video was directed by Storm Thorgerson, who also directed the controversial video to Belouis Some's earlier hit, "Imagination". The video features scenes from seaside towns on the east coast of England, including Aldeburgh in Suffolk.

After the music video was filmed, watchmaker Swatch paid for a second take which included extras dressed in Swatch clothing. The company hoped that Swatch would become so associated with the song that when the music video aired, people thought of Swatch even though the product was not present. "It becomes a Swatch video," said Nancy Kadner, director of advertising for the Swiss-based company.

Charts

Cover versions
In 1986, Murray Head released his version of the song as a single through Virgin. The single was unintentionally released around the same time as the 1986 reissue of Some's version. Head told the Sunday Mirror in April 1986: "By the time we discovered Belouis Some was releasing his version it was too late. You don't set out to have a chart battle because inevitably both sides lose. There's nothing I can do about the clash. It's justifiably his song." Head's version did not enter the UK Singles Chart.

References

1984 songs
1985 singles
1986 singles
Belouis Some songs
Murray Head songs
Parlophone singles
Songs written by Belouis Some
Virgin Records singles